Abhishek Bhat (born 19 November 1989) is an Indian first-class cricketer who plays for Saurashtra. He made his List A debut on 3 March 2014, for Saurashtra in the 2013–14 Vijay Hazare Trophy.

References

External links
 

1989 births
Living people
Indian cricketers
Saurashtra cricketers
Place of birth missing (living people)